The women's pentathlon event at the 1978 Commonwealth Games was held on 6 August at the Commonwealth Stadium in Edmonton, Alberta, Canada. This was the last time that this event was contested at the Commonwealth Games, four years later being replaced by the heptathlon.

Results

References

 Final results (The Sydney Morning Herald)
 Final results (The Canberra Times)
 Australian results

Athletics at the 1978 Commonwealth Games
1982